Black plum is a common name for several plants and may refer to:

Diospyros australis, native to eastern Australia
Pouteria australis, native to eastern Australia
Prunus domestica, the common cultivated plum
Prunus nigra, native to eastern North America
Syzygium cumini, native to south and southeast Asia
Vitex doniana, native to Africa